Kartkisyak (Qartkiśäk) is a rural locality (a village) in Askinsky District, Bashkortostan, Russia. The population was 512 as of 2010. There are 9 streets.

Geography 
Kartkisyak is located 27 km south of Askino (the district's administrative centre) by road. Askish is the nearest rural locality.

References 

Rural localities in Askinsky District